Maria Elisabeth Oswald is an Austrian cryptographer known for her work on side-channel attacks including power analysis and on implementations of cryptosystems that are resistant to these attacks. She is a professor at the University of Klagenfurt.

Education and career
Oswald is originally from Wolfsberg, Carinthia.

She started working at the University of Bristol in 2006 as a lecturer, and later became Professor in Applied Cryptography there. She moved to Klagenfurt in 2019, describing herself as a "Brexit refugee". She continues to be affiliated with the University of Bristol as an Honorary Professor.

Book
With Stefan Mangard and Thomas Popp, Oswald is a coauthor of the book Power Analysis Attacks: Revealing the Secrets of Smartcards (Springer, 2007).

References

External links

Year of birth missing (living people)
Living people
Austrian cryptographers
Austrian women computer scientists
Modern cryptographers
Graz University of Technology alumni
Academics of the University of Bristol
Academic staff of the University of Klagenfurt